Jean-René Toumelin (7 July 1942 – 25 September 2022) was a French sporting director.

Biography
In 1996, Toumelin succeeded  as President of Football Club de Nantes. His presidency was marked by the sale of many players against his will.

References

1942 births
2022 deaths
French sports businesspeople
FC Nantes non-playing staff
Sportspeople from Morbihan
French football chairmen and investors